SS Kaisar-I-Hind was a large P&O steamer for mail and passengers, built by Caird & Company, launched on 28 June 1914, and first departed London for Bombay on 1 October 1914.

References

External links

1914 ships
Ships of P&O (company)